Events from the year 1816 in Germany.

Incumbents

Kingdoms 
 Kingdom of Prussia
 Monarch – Frederick William III of Prussia (16 November 1797 – 7 June 1840)
 Kingdom of Bavaria
 Maximilian I (1 January 1806 – 13 October 1825)
 Kingdom of Saxony
 Frederick Augustus I (20 December 1806 – 5 May 1827)
 Kingdom of Hanover
 George III (25 October 1760 –29 January 1820)
 Kingdom of Württemberg
 Frederick I (22 December 1797 – 30 October 1816)
William (30 October 1816 – 25 June 1864)

Grand Duchies 
 Grand Duke of Baden
Charles 10 June 1811 – 8 December 1818
 Grand Duke of Hesse
 Louis I (14 August 1806 – 6 April 1830)
 Grand Duke of Mecklenburg-Schwerin
 Frederick Francis I– (24 April 1785 – 1 February 1837)
 Grand Duke of Mecklenburg-Strelitz
 Charles II (2 June 1794 – 6 November 1816)
George (6 November 1816 – 6 September 1860)
 Grand Duke of Oldenburg
 Wilhelm (6 July 1785 –2 July 1823 ) Due to mental illness, Wilhelm was duke in name only, with his cousin Peter, Prince-Bishop of Lübeck, acting as regent throughout his entire reign.
 Peter I (2 July 1823 - 21 May 1829)
 Grand Duke of Saxe-Weimar-Eisenach
 Charles Frederick (14 June 1828 - 8 July 1853)

Principalities 
 Schaumburg-Lippe
 George William (13 February 1787 - 1860)
 Schwarzburg-Rudolstadt
 Friedrich Günther (28 April 1807 - 28 June 1867)
 Schwarzburg-Sondershausen
 Günther Friedrich Karl I (14 October 1794 - 19 August 1835)
 Principality of Lippe
 Leopold II (5 November 1802 - 1 January 1851)
 Principality of Reuss-Greiz
Heinrich XIII (28 June 1800 – 29 January 1817)
 Waldeck and Pyrmont
 George II (9 September 1813 - 15 May 1845)

Duchies 
 Duke of Anhalt-Dessau
Leopold III (16 December 1751 – 9 August 1817)
 Duke of Brunswick
 Charles II (16 June 1815 – 9 September 1830)
 Duke of Saxe-Altenburg
 Duke of Saxe-Hildburghausen (1780–1826)  - Frederick
 Duke of Saxe-Coburg and Gotha
 Ernest I (9 December 1806 – 12 November 1826)
 Duke of Saxe-Meiningen
 Bernhard II (24 December 1803 – 20 September 1866)
 Duke of Schleswig-Holstein-Sonderburg-Beck
 Frederick Charles Louis (24 February 1775 – 25 March 1816)
Frederick William (25 March 1816 – 6 July 1825)

Events 

 January 9 – Ludwig van Beethoven obtains custody of his nephew Karl, after a legal battle with the boy's mother.
10 February – Friedrich Karl Ludwig, Duke of Schleswig-Holstein-Sonderburg-Beck, dies and is succeeded by Friedrich Wilhelm, his son and founder of the House of Glücksburg.
April 17 – Josef von Spaun writes to Johann Wolfgang von Goethe for permission to have his poems set to music by the youthful Franz Schubert.
 July 13 – Carl Maria von Weber meets Count Vitzthum von Eckstädt at Carlsbad; the encounter leads to Weber being appointed Kapellmeister at Dresden.
 October 2 – Johann Nepomuk Hummel is offered a post at Stuttgart by Duke Frederick I of Württemberg.
 November 19 – Carl Maria von Weber becomes engaged to soprano Caroline Brandt.
 Ludwig van Beethoven : To the distant beloved op. 98 (song cycle); Der Mann von Wort - Lied Op. 99; Piano Sonata No. 28 op.101 (completed in 1816, premiered in 1817)
 Johann Simon Mayr : 6 cantatas ( Egeria , Annibale , Lo spavento , La tempesta , Le Festivals d'Ercole , L'armonia )
 Carl Maria von Weber : Piano Sonata No. 2 in A flat major op. 39; Piano Sonata No. 3 in D minor, Op. 49; Grand Duo concertant for clarinet and piano in E flat major op.48 (chamber music)
 Franz Bopp – Über das Conjugationssystem der Sanskritsprache in Vergleichung mit jenem der griechischen, lateinischen, persischen und germanischen Sprache (On the Conjugation System of Sanskrit in comparison with that of Greek, Latin, Persian and Germanic)
 Pinkus Müller brewery established.
 Province of Saxony established
 Province of Brandenburg established
 The Neue Wache, a listed building on Unter den Linden boulevard in the historic centre of Berlin. Erected from 1816 to 1818.

Births 

 24 May – Emanuel Leutze, German-American painter (d. 1868)

 21 July – Paul Reuter, German entrepreneur (d. 1899)
 11 September – Carl Zeiss, German maker of optical instruments (d. 1888)
 November 1 – Friedrich Wilhelm Hackländer, German novelist, dramatist and travel writer (died 1877)
 10 December – August Karl von Goeben, Prussian general (d. 1880)
 13 December – Werner von Siemens, German inventor, industrialist (d. 1892)
 29 December – Carl Ludwig, German physician, physiologist (d. 1895)

Deaths 

 3 March – Johann August von Starck, German pastor (b. 1741)
 April 28 – Johann Heinrich Abicht, German philosopher (born 1762)
 9 August – Johann August Apel, German writer, jurist (b. 1771)
 29 August – Johann Hieronymus Schröter, German astronomer (b. 1745)
 6 November – Charles II, Grand Duke of Mecklenburg-Strelitz (b. 1741)
 Christian Gottlob Fechhelm, German portrait and historical painter (born 1732)

References 

Years of the 19th century in Germany
 
Germany
Germany